The Squaw Man (known as The White Man in the United Kingdom) is a 1914 American silent Western film directed by Cecil B. DeMille and Oscar C. Apfel, and starring Dustin Farnum. It was DeMille's directorial debut and one of the first feature films to be shot in what is now Hollywood.

Plot

James Wynnegate (Dustin Farnum) and his cousin, Henry (Monroe Salisbury), are upper class Englishmen and trustees for an orphans’ fund. Henry loses money in a bet at a derby and embezzles money from “the fund” to pay off his debts. When war office officials are informed of the money missing they pursue James, but he successfully escapes to Wyoming. There, James rescues Nat-U-Ritch (Lillian St. Cyr), daughter to the chief of the Utes tribe, from local outlaw Cash Hawkins (William Elmer). Hawkins plans to exact his revenge on James, but has his plans thwarted by Nat-U-Ritch, who shoots him dead. Later, James has an accident in the mountains and needs to be rescued. Nat-U-Ritch discovers him and carries him back to safety. As she nurses him back to health, they fall in love and later have a child.

Meanwhile, during an exploration of the Alps, Henry falls off a cliff. Before he succumbs to his injuries, Henry signs a letter of confession proclaiming James’s innocence in the embezzlement. Before Henry's widow, Lady Diana (Winifred Kingston) and others arrive in Wyoming to tell James about the news, the Sheriff recovers the murder weapon that was used against Cash Hawkins in James and Nat-U-Ritch's home. Realizing that their son is not safe, the couple sends him away, leaving them both distraught. Facing the possibilities of losing both her son and her freedom, Nat-U-Ritch decides to take her own life instead. The movie ends with both the chief of the Utes tribe and James embracing her body.

Cast

 Dustin Farnum as Capt. James Wynnegate aka Jim Carston
 Monroe Salisbury as Sir Henry, Earl of Kerhill
 Lillian St. Cyr as Nat-u-Ritch
 Winifred Kingston as Lady Diana, Countess of Kerhill
 'Baby' Carmen De Rue as Hal
 Joseph Singleton as Tab-y-wana
 William Elmer as Cash Hawkins
 Mrs. A.W. Filson as The Dowager Lady Elizabeth Kerhill
 Haidee Fuller as Lady Mabel Wynnegate
 Foster Knox as Sir John
 Dick La Reno as Big Bill
 Richard L'Estrange as Grouchy
 Fred Montague as Mr. Petrie
 Cecil B. DeMille as Faro Dealer
 Cecilia de Mille as Child
 Hal Roach as Townsman
 Art Acord as Townsman
 Raymond Hatton as Bit part

Production background

The only onscreen filmmaking credit is "Picturized by Cecil B. DeMille and Oscar C. Apfel." The film was adapted by DeMille and Apfel from the 1905 stage play of the same name by Edwin Milton Royle, and produced by DeMille, Apfel, and Jesse L. Lasky for the Jesse L. Lasky Feature Play Company, its first film.

This first screen version of the story was the legendary DeMille's first movie assignment. It was also the first feature-length film shot in California, partly in what became Hollywood. Film historians agree that shorts had previously been filmed in Hollywood, with D. W. Griffith's In Old California (1910) considered the earliest. DeMille rented what is now known as the Lasky-DeMille Barn at the southeast corner of Selma and Vine Streets to serve as their studio and production office; today it is home to the Hollywood Heritage Museum. Shooting on The Squaw Man began December 29, 1913, and finished January 20, 1914.

DeMille wanted to emphasize the outdoors and wanted to shoot the movie in exotic scenery and great vistas. Initially he traveled to Flagstaff, Arizona to film the movie. After seeing the vast amount of mountains near Flagstaff, the production was moved to Los Angeles. Harbor scenes were shot in San Pedro, California and the western saloon set was built beside railroad tracks in the San Fernando Valley. Footage of cattle on the open range was shot at Keen Camp near Idyllwild, California, while snow scenes were shot at Mount Palomar. Cecil B. DeMille felt that lighting in a movie was extremely important and viewed it as the visual and emotional foundation to build his image. He believed that lighting was to a film as “music is to an opera”.

The Squaw Man went on to become the only movie successfully filmed three times by the same director/producer, DeMille. He filmed a silent remake in 1918, and a talkie version in 1931. The Squaw Man was 74 minutes long and generated $244,700 in profit.

Characters 
The main character James Wynnegate played by Dustin Farnum, was cast as the hero for the film.  Farnum was a notable Broadway star and his wife in real life Winifred Kingston was also a well-known actress. She played the English love interest. Red Wing (real name Lillian St. Cyr) was born into the Winnebago Tribe of Nebraska on the Winnebago Reservation, and she played the American Indian wife.

Controversies 
Non-Native American actor Joseph Singleton played the role of Tabywana, Nat-U-Ritch's father. Lillian St. Cyr of the Winnebago Tribe of Nebraska was cast to play the role of Nat-U-Ritch, a member of the Ute tribe. She is also known as "Princess Redwing".  St. Cyr along with her husband James Young Deer (of the Nanticoke people of Delaware) have been regarded as one of the first "Native American power couple" in Hollywood, along with Mona Darkfeather and her husband, director Frank E. Montgomery. DeMille had selected Lillian St. Cyr, but his first choice had been Darkfeather, who was not available.

During the early silent film era, films based on Native Americans were popular. The central theme of this film was miscegenation. In the state of California, anti-miscegenation laws existed until 1948; however, while African-Americans couldn't legally marry whites in California during filming, marriages between Native Americans and whites were permitted. Though there were Native American actors, whites were mostly cast as Native characters.

During the early teens, Young Deer and Lillian St. Cyr helped to transform how Native American characters were represented. The characters they created were sympathetic in complex ways, although other studios such as Kalem Company were also attempting to accurately portray Natives in film. However, other scholars argue that Native American-themed silent films did not alter in any way the dominant perception of Natives themselves. Many films displayed the Native American experience from many different perspectives and did involve Native American writers, filmmakers, and actors during this time period.

See also
 The House That Shadows Built (1931 promotional film by Paramount)

References

External links

 
 
 
 

1914 films
1914 Western (genre) films
1914 directorial debut films
1914 drama films
American black-and-white films
American films based on plays
Articles containing video clips
Famous Players-Lasky films
Films directed by Cecil B. DeMille
Films directed by Oscar Apfel
Films set in England
Silent American Western (genre) films
Films set in Wyoming
1910s American films